Linda Lael Miller (born 1949 as Linda Lael), is a best-selling American author of more than 100 contemporary and historical romance novels.  She has also written under the pen name Lael St. James.

Personal life
Linda Lael was born in 1949 in Washington.  Her father was a town marshal, although he, along with her uncle Jake "Jiggs" Lael also competed on the rodeo circuit. A voracious reader, Linda began writing her own stories when she was 10.  As a child, Linda often visited with an elderly neighbor and listened to stories of her neighbor's experiences meeting outlaw Jesse James and witnessing a gunfight involving the Dalton Brothers.  Lael graduated from high school in Northport, WA but did not attend college.   After her marriage, Miller spent 10 years living in Spokane before moving away. She has lived in Italy and in London. After five years living in Arizona, Miller moved back to Washington in 2006.

Miller has established a foundation, the Linda Lael Miller Scholarships for Women.  These scholarships are intended to allow women who are struggling to further their education, either through a trade school or a traditional college or university.  The scholarships are funded by the fees Miller commands at speaking engagements, and winners are allowed to spend the proceeds on any expense (including childcare and transportation) that will allow her to attend school.

Works
Her first manuscripts were rejected, but publishers finally purchased Fletcher's Woman, a historical romance.  Since then, she has published over 77 novels, in a variety of romance novel subgenres, including contemporary, suspense, time-travel, and paranormal.  The historical romances have been set in a range of time frames, from the Medieval period to the American West.

Miller is best known for her romances set in the Western United States.  One of these, McKettrick's Choice, reached number 15 on the New York Times Bestseller List. In an interview, Miller stated that: "I love westerns best of all.  To me, the cowboy is the great North American myth, the ideal of honor, courage and persistence we need to live up to."  She has also described her western settings as "naturally romantic, from the big sky to the lonely prairie, and it's the perfect backdrop for adventure, danger, grand passion, joy, and sorrow—the whole gamut of human emotions".

The heroines of Miller's novels are known for being strong, independent women.  Miller has stated that she wants her heroines to be good examples, proving that they can take care of themselves.

She has been nominated six times for the Romance Writers of America RITA Award, the highest honor given to a romance author.  She has won the Silver Pen Award as well as the Romantic Times award for Most Sensual Historical Romance.

Bibliography

Springwater series
Springwater (Pocket, 1998) 
Rachel (Pocket, 1999) 
Savannah (Pocket, 1999) 
Miranda (Pocket, 1999) 
Jessica (Pocket, 1999) 
A Springwater Christmas (Pocket, 1999) 
Springwater Wedding (Pocket, 2002)

Primrose series
Bridget (Pocket, 2000) 
Christy (Pocket, 2000) 
Skye (Pocket, 2000) 
Megan (Pocket, 2000) 
Last Chance Cafe (Pocket Star, 2003)

Vampire series
Forever and the Night (Berkley, 1993) 
For All Eternity (Berkley, 1994) 
Time Without End (Berkley, 1995) 
Tonight and Always (Berkley, 1996)

Orphan Train series
Lily and the Major (Pocket, 1990) 
Emma and the Outlaw (Pocket, 1991) 
Caroline and the Raider (Pocket, 1992)

McKettrick series
High Country Bride (Pocket, 2002) 
Shotgun Bride (Pocket Star, 2003) 
Secondhand Bride (Pocket, 2004) 
McKettrick's Choice (HQN Books, 2005) 
Sierra's Homecoming (Silhouette, 2006) 
McKettrick's Luck (Harlequin Books, 2007) 
McKettrick's Pride (Harlequin Books, 2007) 
McKettrick's Heart (Harlequin Books, 2007) 
The McKettrick Way (Harlequin Books, 2007) 
A McKettrick Christmas (Harlequin Books, 2008)
McKettricks Of Texas: Tate (HQN Books, 2010) 
McKettricks Of Texas: Garrett (HQN Books, 2010)
McKettricks Of Texas: Austin (HQN Books, 2010)
A Lawman's Christmas (HQN Books, 2011)
An Outlaw's Christmas (HQN, Books, 2012)

Stone Creek series
The Man From Stone Creek (HQN Books, 2007) 
A Wanted Man (HQN Books, 2007) 
The Rustler (HQN Books, 2008) 
A Stone Creek Christmas (Silhouette, 2008) 
The Bridegroom, due Aug 2009 (HQN Books, 2009) 
At Home in Stone Creek,due Dec 2009 (Silhouette Special Edition)

Montana Creed series
Logan, (HQN Books 2009) 
Dylan, (HQN Books 2009) 
Tyler, (HQN Books 2009) 
A Creed Country Christmas, (HQN Books 2009)
A Creed in Stone Creek, (HQN Books 2011)
Creed's Honor, (HQN Book 2011)
The Creed Legacy, (HQN Book 2011)

Parable, Montana series
Big Sky Country, (HQN Books 2012) 
Big Sky Mountain, (HQN Books 2012) 
Big Sky River, (HQN Books 2012) 
Big Sky Summer, (HQN Books 2013)
Big Sky Wedding, (HQN Books 2013)
Big Sky Secrets, (HQN Books 2014)

Time-Travel
Here and Then (Silhouette, 1992) 
There and Now (Silhouette, 1992) 
Knights (Pocket, 1996) 
Pirates (Pocket, 1996)

Clare Westbrook
Don't Look Now (Pocket Star, 2004) 
Never Look Back (Pocket Star, 2005) 
One Last Look (Pocket, 2006)

Mojo Sheepshanks series
Deadly Gamble, (HQN Books, 2008) 
Deadly Deception, (HQN Books, 2008) 
Arizona Wild, (HQN Books, 2016) [Reissue of Deadly Gamble]
Arizona Heat, (HQN Books December 27, 2016) [Reissue of Deadly Deception]

Australian series
Moonfire (Pocket, 1988) 
Angelfire (Pocket, 1991)

The Corbins
Banner O'Brien (Pocket, 1991) 
Corbin's Fancy (Pocket, 1991) 
Memory's Embrace (Pocket, 1991) 
My Darling Melissa (Pocket, 2008)

The Quade series
Yankee Wife (Pocket, 1993) 
Taming Charlotte (Pocket, 1993) 
Princess Annie (Pocket, 1994)

Writing as Lael St. James
My Lady Wayward (Pocket, 2001) 
My Lady Beloved (Pocket, 2001)

Brides of Bliss County series
The Marriage Pact, (HQN Books 2014)
The Marriage Charm, (HQN Books 2015)
The Marriage Season, (HQN Books 2015)
Christmas In Mustang Creek, (HQN Books 2015)

Carsons of Mustang Creek series
Once a Rancher, (HQN Books March 2016)
Always a Cowboy, (HQN Books August 30, 2016)
Forever a Hero, (HQN Book March 28, 2017)

Other
Queen of the Rodeo as part of More than Words Vol 4 (Harlequin, 2008) 
The Leopard's Woman (Silhouette, 2002) 
Two Brothers (Pocket, 2001) 
Courting Susannah (Pocket, 1998) 
One Wish (Pocket, 2000) 
The Vow (Pocket, 1998) 
My Outlaw (Pocket, 1997) 
Together (HarperTorch, 1996) 
The Legacy (Pocket, 1994) 
Daniel's Bride (Pocket, 1992) 
Wild About Harry (Silhouette, 1991) 
Glory, Glory, (Silhouette, 1990) 
Escape From Cabriz, (Silhouette, 1990) 
Mixed Messages (Mira, 1996) 
Daring Moves, (Silhouette, 1990) 
Just Kate, (Harlequin, 2005) 
Only Forever (Mira, 1995) 
Used-to-be-Lovers (Mira, 2002) 
Wanton Angel (Pocket, 1991) 
Lauralee (Pocket, 1986) 
Ragged Rainbows (Mira, 1998) 
State Secrets, (Mira, 1994) 
State Secrets, Reissue(Harlequin Famous Firsts, due June 2009) 
Part of the Bargain, (Silhouette, 1994) 
Willow (Pocket, 1990) 
Snowflakes on the Sea, (Silhouette, 1989) 
Desire and Destiny (Pocket, 1990) 
Fletcher's Woman (Pocket, 1991)

Awards
1990-1991 - Romantic Times Career Achievement Award for series Love and Laughter
1990-1991 - Romantic Times Reviewers' Choice Award for Best Historical Romance Sequel, Emma and the Outlaw
1991-1992 - Romantic Times Reviewers' Choice Award for Best Historical Romance, Daniel's Bride
1992-1993 - Romantic Times Career Achievement Award finalist for Historical Romance
1992-1993 - Romantic Times Reviewers' Choice Award finalist for Best Historical Romance, Yankee Wife
1993-1993 - Romantic Times Career Achievement Award finalist for Contemporary Fantasy
1993 - The Talisman Book of the Year, Forever and the Night
1993 - Affaire de Coeur Reader-Writer Award finalist for Outstanding Achiever
1993 - Affaire de Coeur Reader-Writer Award finalist for Best American Historical, Yankee Wife
1993-1994 - Romantic Times Reviewers' Choice Award finalist for Best Historical Romantic Adventure, Taming Charlotte'
1993-1994 - Romantic Times Reviewers' Choice Award finalist for Best Contemporary Romantic Suspense, Forever and the Night1994 - Waldenbooks Bestselling Trend Title (Vampire), For All Eternity1995 - Romance Writers of America RITA Award finalist for Time Without End1995 - Waldenbooks Bestselling Paranormal Title, Time Without End1995-1996 - Romantic Times Reviewers' Choice Award for Best Historical Time-Travel, Knights1996-1997 - Romantic Times Reviewers' Choice Award finalist for Best Contemporary Fantasy Romance, Tonight and Always1997-1998 - Romantic Times Reviewers' Choice Award for Best Heroes
1997-1998 - Romantic Times Reviewers' Choice Award finalist for Best Innovative Historical Romance, The Vow1997-1998 - Romantic Times Career Achievement Award for Historical Fantasy
1998 - Barnes & Noble.com Historical Romance Editor's Pick, Two Brothers1998-1999 - Romantic Times Career Achievement Award finalist for Historical Storyteller of the Year
1998-1999 - Romantic Times Reviewers' Choice Award finalist forBest Historical Romance in a series, A Springwater Christmas1999-2000 - Romantic Times Reviewers' Choice Award finalist for Best Historical Romance of the Year, One Wish1999 - Greater Detroit Romance Writers of America Booksellers' Best Award for Best Long Historical Romance, A Springwater Christmas2000 - Reviewers International Organization Dorothy Parker Award of Excellence Finalist for Favorite Historical Romance, Courting Susannah
2002 - Reviewers International Organization Dorothy Parker Award of Excellence Finalist for Favorite Contemporary Romance, Last Chance Cafe
2002 - The Word on Romance Reviewer's Rose Award finalist for Best Contemporary Romance, Last Chance Cafe

References

External links
Linda Lael Miller's Official Web Site
Linda Lael Miller 2007 Interview on Sidewalks Entertainment

20th-century American novelists
21st-century American novelists
American romantic fiction writers
American women novelists
Women romantic fiction writers
1949 births
Living people
20th-century American women writers
21st-century American women writers